West Wing Week is a week web-episode released by The White House about the week's events concerning the President of the United States. The show was created in 2010 during the 2nd year of the Presidency of Barack Obama. The footage was shot and edited by the video team from the Office of Digital Strategy and narrated by White House Press Secretary Josh Earnest; it was initially shot and edited by former White House videographer Arun Chaudhary, who created the series.

Background and key people

West Wing Week was created in 2010 during the 2nd year of the Presidency of Barack Obama. The weekly shows were first proposed by Arun Chaudhary, who served as the Obama presidential campaign's New Media Road Director; to this end, he created an un-aired pilot of the proposed series for his seniors. The series is narrated by Josh Earnest, Josh Earnest said that Arun Chaudhary "is the creative force behind West Wing Week". Chaudhary was the first official White House videographer in history. The West Wing Week Project was part of President Barack Obama's commitment to transparent government. The two individuals who have held the position of official videographer both worked for the 2008 Obama presidential campaign; additionally the White House has declined to provide any information about the costs, salary or budget lines for the project.

Production
The show is shot with a Sony EX3, a 1980s-era 416 Sennheiser shotgun microphone and subsequently edited on Final Cut Pro. Video footage is recorded throughout the week by the White House videographer. The material is then usually edited on a Thursday and released the next day (usually on Friday at 12:00 AM EDT). According to the Presidential Record Act all footage must be archived. It is stored in the presidential records. The episodes titles are decided by Arun Chaudhary. The music used in West Wing Week is performed by the United States Marine Band. At the end of each episode there is usually a "sting", or unscripted twist.

Critical reception
Everything that is posted in West Wing Week is vetted and must be approved for release by The White House Press Office. This has caused some critics to argue that the webcast videos are "nothing more than press releases" some saying it "borders on propaganda".

David Almacy, former White House internet director during President George W Bush's administration, argues that while the idea of West Wing Week is "intriguing", it is an unnecessary expense. Almacy says "It is taxpayer funded and the videographer has the ability to take scenes and edit them the way they wish, and when you have a White House press corps that's a hundred of feet away from the Oval Office," he continues, "The videographer is a federal employee, the power of editing could cause some concerns about perceived propaganda." ... "With average views between 5,000 and 10,000 for most West Wing Weeks (with a few exceptions), one could argue that the costs associated with producing the weekly installments aren't providing much value to citizens, especially in tough economic times when Congress and the White House are looking for ways to cut the budget," adds Mr Almacy.

One unnamed journalist, interviewed by the BBC, said some members of the White House press corps "resent" the access Chaudhary gets, adding that sometimes events appear on West Wing Week that were closed to the press.

Episodes
West Wing Week is a weekly released (usually on Fridays at 12:00 am EDT) web-episode by The White House of the weeks events concerning the President of the United States. Episodes are also available via YouTube, The White House website and through iTunes. There are also special episodes, such as Mailbag and Dispatch episodes. Usually before a dispatch episodes is released the White House will release a preview trailer. Dispatches episodes are devoted to a specific topic, for example, in 2011 there was a special "Dispatches from Sudan". Mailbag episodes are released 2–3 times a year and focus on answering question sent to the President.

2010

2011

2016

See also

References

Attribution
  The above article incorporates text from the United States White House website, which is in the public domain.

External links
 

White House
American non-fiction web series